Lac des Cordes is a lake in Hautes-Alpes, France. It is located close to the northern wall of the Pic de Rochebrune.

The lake can be accessed by hiking, starting either from the hamlet of Bourgea or from the refuge of Fonts de Cervières (.

Cordes